Third Annual Pipe Dream is the third album by the Southern rock band Atlanta Rhythm Section, released in 1974. The band scored their first Top 40 hit with "Doraville", peaking at #35.

Track listing

Personnel
Barry Bailey - guitar
J.R. Cobb - guitar, backing vocals
Dean Daughtry - keyboards
Paul Goddard - bass
Ronnie Hammond - vocals, backing vocals
Michael Huey - conductor
Hugh Jarrett - vocals
Mylon LeFevre - vocals
Robert Nix - percussion, drums, backing vocals

Production
Producer: Buddy Buie
Engineer: Rodney Mills

Charts
Album

Singles

References

Atlanta Rhythm Section albums
1974 albums
Albums produced by Buddy Buie
Polydor Records albums